Yörgüç Tipu Sharif, better known as Tipu Sharif, is a Pakistan-based actor and singer-songwriter of Pakistani and Turkish descent. His mother is from Izmir, while his father is from Karachi, Pakistan.

Career
Tipu Sharif has been active in the Pakistani television industry since 2005, and in the span of 11 years he has acted in close to 100 drama serials, in which he has portrayed diverse characters. He made his film debut in 2015 with the biographical film Manto. He was also in a supporting role in the film Saawan (2016), which was directed by Farhan Alam.

Beyond acting, Tipu's debut album Ilham released in summer of 2016. Before its release, Tipu released a music video for the single Lamhay from the album, to positive reviews.

Filmography
Ballay Ki Bali (2011)
 Manto (2015)
 Saawan (2016)

Television
 Meri Behan Meri Dewrani
 Kahi Unkahi as Zeeshan
 Main Abdul Qadir Hoon as Pasha
 Tum Jo Miley as Jawad
 Man-o-Salwa as Sohail
  Hotel
 Ru Baru as Tipu
 Mere Meherbaan as Waleed
2015: Nikah as Nadeem
 Mohabbat Aag Si as Sharafat
  Anabiya as Munib
 Ghayal as Faiz
 Sang-e-Mar Mar as Saif Ur Rahman
 Izn-e-Rukhsat as Daniyal
 Pujaran
 Chanar Ghati as Sajid
 Naseebon Jali as Aslam
 Mohabbatain Chahatein
 Jab We Wed as Ranjha
 Baba Jani as Nasir
 Guddu as Zaheer
 Kaisi Teri Khudgarzi as Dara

Awards
 14th PTV Awards - Best Actor - won

References

External links

Living people
Pakistani male film actors
Pakistani male television actors
Pakistani male singers
Pakistani people of Turkish descent
Institute of Business Administration, Karachi alumni
Year of birth missing (living people)
Male actors from Istanbul
Male actors from Karachi
PTV Award winners